IEEE Transactions on Computer-Aided Design of Integrated Circuits and Systems (sometimes abbreviated IEEE TCAD or IEEE Transactions on CAD) is a monthly peer-reviewed scientific journal covering the design, analysis, and use of computer-aided design of integrated circuits and systems. It is published by the IEEE Circuits and Systems Society and the IEEE Council on Electronic Design Automation (Institute of Electrical and Electronics Engineers). The journal was established in 1982 and the editor-in-chief is Rajesh K. Gupta (University of California at San Diego). According to the Journal Citation Reports, the journal has a 2020 impact factor of 2.807.

Past editor-in-chief 
 Rajesh K. Gupta (2018-2022)
 Vijaykrishnan Narayanan (2014-2018)
 Sachin Sapatnekar (2010-2014)

See also 
Electronic design automation

References

External links 
 

Transactions on Computer-Aided Design
Engineering journals
Monthly journals
English-language journals
Publications established in 1982
1982 establishments in the United States